Frank Robert Hill (21 May 1906 – 28 August 1993) was a Scottish football player and manager.

Playing career

Forfar and Aberdeen
Hill was born in Forfar and started his career at Forfar Athletic, joining the club in 1924. He moved to Aberdeen in 1928 and played over 100 Scottish Division One matches. A right-half (which was more or less the equivalent of a defensive midfield position), Hill earned the nickname "Tiger" for his "tigerish" tackling. During his four years at Aberdeen, he also won three caps for Scotland (between 1930 and 1931).

Hill left Aberdeen under something of a cloud, being one of five players dropped by manager Paddy Travers in November 1931.  At the time, the reasons were not clear, but the club's official history claims that several players had been involved in a betting scandal.  No players were ever charged with any offence, but none of them ever played for Aberdeen again. Hill had played a total of 106 times for Aberdeen, scoring 10 goals.

Arsenal
In 1932, he was signed by Herbert Chapman's Arsenal, who had just finished as runners-up in both the First Division and FA Cup. He made his debut against Blackburn Rovers on 15 October 1932. At the time, Arsenal were spoilt for wing-halves and Hill competed for his place with Charlie Jones, Bob John, Wilf Copping and Jack Crayston. Despite this, Hill featured in all three of Arsenal's 1933, 1934 and 1935 League title campaigns. He also won the 1934 Charity Shield with the Gunners. Hill usually played at right-half but also deputised at left-half or even on the wing.

Hill was squeezed out of the side by Copping and Crayston, and only featured in ten matches in 1935–36, and did not play in Arsenal's FA Cup final victory that season. He requested a transfer and was sold to Second Division Blackpool in the summer of 1936. In all he played 81 games for Arsenal, scoring four goals.

Blackpool
Hill captained Blackpool in the 1936–37 season, helping them to runners-up spot and thus promotion to the First Division. However, he didn't stay in the top flight for long as in September 1937 he joined Second Division side Southampton.

Southampton
In May 1937, Hill was recruited by Tom Parker to join Southampton as part of his drive to strengthen the team in an attempt to gain promotion from the Second Division, along with David Affleck (from Clapton Orient), Billy Bevis (from Portsmouth) and Ray Parkin (from Middlesbrough). Southampton paid £2000 for his services and acquired "a half-back with a strong personality and ball-winning abilities". Hill's resolve and leadership helped steer Saints away from relegation during 1937–38, only for him to suffer a series of injuries the following season which sidelined him for long periods.

Hill eventually fell out with the Board of Directors when it was revealed that he had secretly applied for various managerial positions and he left the club in 1939 to take up a position as assistant trainer at Preston North End, although Southampton refused to release his player registration until 1943. He made 53 appearances for Southampton, scoring three goals.

During the Second World War, when football was suspended, Hill served in the Royal Air Force in India.

Managerial career
Hill returned to Britain in 1944 and became player-manager of Crewe Alexandra (making 20 appearances, excluding Football War League games, and playing his last game for Crewe in February 1948) until he was 42. He went on to manage Burnley from September 1948 to 1954 then Preston North End from 1954 to 1956.

He then moved abroad in January 1957, coaching the Iraqi military team as well as Iraqi club Al-Quwa Al-Jawiya, before returning to take over at Notts County in 1958. He helped County to promotion to the Third Division in 1959–60, and moved to Charlton Athletic, who were bottom of the Second Division, in 1961. He saved Charlton from relegation that season and took them to fourth in 1963–64. However, he could not make the good form last and was sacked in the summer of 1965.

Hill finished his career as a scout for Manchester City, before retiring. He moved with his wife Doris and son David to Lafayette, California, USA in 1967 where they owned "Piccadilly Circus Fish'n Chips" and he refereed locally at the college level well into his 70s.

He died in California in August 1993, aged 87.

Managerial statistics

Honours

As a player
Arsenal
Football League championship: 1932–33, 1933–34 and 1934–35
Charity Shield: 1933, 1934

Blackpool
Football League Division 2, runners-up: 1936–37

As a manager
Notts County 
Football League Division 4, runners-up: 1959–60

References

External links

Scotland profile

1906 births
1993 deaths
Scottish footballers
Scotland international footballers
Aberdeen F.C. players
Arsenal F.C. players
Blackpool F.C. players
Forfar Athletic F.C. players
Southampton F.C. players
Crewe Alexandra F.C. players
Scottish football managers
Scottish expatriate football managers
Crewe Alexandra F.C. managers
Burnley F.C. managers
Preston North End F.C. managers
Notts County F.C. managers
Charlton Athletic F.C. managers
Royal Air Force personnel of World War II
People from Forfar
English Football League managers
Scottish Football League players
Scottish Football League representative players
English Football League players
Association football wing halves
Footballers from Angus, Scotland